Writers Guild may refer to:

 Australian Writers' Guild
 New Zealand Writers Guild
 Writers Guild of America
 Writers Guild of America, East
 Writers Guild of America, West
 Writers Guild of Canada
 Writers' Guild of Great Britain